A number of steamships were named Aeolus, including –

, a German cargo ship in service 1904–16
, a Swedish coaster that was damaged by fire in 1927
, an American ocean liner in service 1919–22
, a German Hansa A type cargo ship in service 1943–45

Ship names